"The Death of Queen Jane" is an English ballad that describes the events surrounding the death of a Queen Jane. It is catalogued by Francis James Child as Child #170. Some of the versions given are Scottish, in which the queen's name is Jeanie or Jeany.

Though the circumstances of the ballad's composition are not documented, a close correspondence of names and events suggests that it very likely describes Jane Seymour, the third wife of Henry VIII of England.  Historically, Jane Seymour gave birth to a son who became Edward VI of England on October 12, 1537.  Unlike in the ballad, where the queen dies of caesarean section, the real Queen Jane gave birth naturally and died of a fever twelve days later.

Synopsis

There are 20 versions of the song given by Child, but they are consistent in the basic tale.  Queen Jane is in difficult labour – the time given ranges from three days to an astonishing six weeks – and asks a succession of people to cut open her sides and save her baby.  Each refuses her in turn, understanding that this would cause her death.  She asks for others to be sent to her – variously her mother, a surgeon or doctor, and King Henry – and of each she makes the same request.  Finally someone – King Henry in most versions – succumbs to her pleas and the surgery is done, whereupon she dies.  The song ends with descriptions of the mourning, and most versions contrast the joy at the birth of a male heir with the grief over the death of the queen.

Versions
The relationship between Queen Jane and King Henry is described as a loving one in the ballad.  In the versions in which he is sent for to hear her plea he is shown as first refusing:

Only when she falls into a swoon – presumably interpreted that she was going to die anyway - are her instructions followed.

Version 170D makes this explicit:

Many versions describe King Henry weeping, his grief for his wife overcoming his joy for his son.  One version mentions Princess Elizabeth, who became Elizabeth I as the one who "goes weeping away."

Text of version 170B
The text is given with the original spelling as Child gives it. This version is one of the more complete ones, and contains most of the story elements found in any of the versions.

There are a few words which may be unfamiliar to modern English speakers.

 laboured or travailed, as in childbirth 
meikle great
ha  hall

Text

In song
Bascom Lamar Lunsford recorded a short Appalachian variant of this ballad in 1935. This recording is available on the Smithsonian Folkways album Bascom Lamar Lunsford: Ballads, Banjo Tunes and Sacred Songs of Western North Carolina.
An original melody composed for this song by Irish guitarist and singer Dáithí Sproule has been widely recorded, including by The Bothy Band, Trian (Liz Carroll, Billy McComiskey and Dáithí Sproule), Loreena McKennitt, Maria Doyle Kennedy, Jon Boden, Méav Ní Mhaolchatha, 10,000 Maniacs, Oscar Isaac in the movie Inside Llewyn Davis, and others.
The ballad is included in Loreena McKennitt's The Wind That Shakes the Barley album.
Recorded by Carol Noonan (Carol Noonan Band) as "Queen Jane" on her recording "The Only Witness" (Philo, CD PH 1209, 1997).
A version of the song was recorded by Oscar Isaac for the movie Inside Llewyn Davis, written and directed by the Coen Brothers.
A version of the song was recorded by Joan Baez on the album Joan Baez/5.
A version of this song was recorded by Andreas Scholl under the title "King Henry" for his album English Folksongs and Lute Songs.
A version was recorded by Karine Polwart on her 2007 album Fairest Floo'er.
A version of this song was recorded by 10,000 Maniacs on the album Twice Told Tales (2015).

References

External links
 The complete text of all the versions given by Child.
 Sound clip available of CusterLaRue singing a version of this song (titled Queen Jane)

Child Ballads
Songs about queens
Songs about death
Cultural depictions of female monarchs
Jane Seymour